Daleka obala (trans. Faraway Coast) was a Croatian (formerly Yugoslav) rock band based in Split, active between 1985 and 2002. The band was composed of Marijan Ban, Jadran Vušković, Boris Hrepić, Bogašin Šoić Mirilović and Zoran Ukić. Two members of the band have gone on to form "The Obala", which has recorded 2 CDs to date.

Most songs have been written by vocalist Marijan Ban, with exceptions, such as Kurve and Osamdesete which were written by pianist and guitarist Bogašin Šoić Mirilović. Ban's abstract range of topics had been an influence on Croatian songwriting. Bogašin Šoić Mirilović died on 21 June 2018.

Zoran Ukić's son Roko is a well-known basketball player, currently playing point guard for KK Split.

The band' song Marica is often playing by the Croatia national football team, but mostly by 2 players Dejan Lovren and Šime Vrsaljko. Most fans call it their theme song.

Discography

 Daleka obala (1990)
 Ludi mornari dolaze u grad (1992)
 Mrlje (1993)
 Morski pas (1994)
 Di si ti (1997)
 Od mora do mora  (1998)
 1999-2000 (1999)
 Uspomena - Sve Najbolje Uzivo (2002) (live album)

References

Croatian rock music groups
Yugoslav rock music groups
Musical groups established in 1988
Musical groups disestablished in 2000
Musicians from Split, Croatia